Maria do Carmo Trovoada Pires de Carvalho Silveira (born 14 February 1961) served as the 13th prime minister of São Tomé and Príncipe from 8 June 2005 to 21 April 2006.

Background
She was educated as an economist at the Donetsk National University (Ukraine), Master of Public Administration from the National School of Administration in Strasbourg and was the third governor of São Tomé and Príncipe's Central Bank from 1999 to 2005, she succeeded Carlos Quaresma Batista de Sousa and was succeeded by Arlindo Afonso Carvalho and again from 2011 to 2016 as the sixth governor succeeding Luís Fernando Moreira de Sousa.

Prime minister
She served as Prime Minister and Minister of Planning and Finance São Tomé and Príncipe from 8 June 2005 to 21 April 2006.

Silveira, the country's second female Prime Minister, is a member of the Movement for the Liberation of São Tomé and Príncipe-Social Democratic Party (MLSTP-PSD) and was a member of the party executive board.

Silveira declared that macroeconomic stability was her priority and made her mark by among others resolving the wage dispute with the unions in the public sector, securing assistance from the IMF and obtaining an agreement with Angola on cooperation in the oil sector.

Succession
Her term as Prime Minister ended after the 2006 parliamentary elections, when the opposition defeated the MLSTP-PSD, and she was succeeded as Prime Minister by Tomé Vera Cruz in 2006.

Executive Secretary of the CPLP
In January 2017, Maria do Carmo assumed the position of Executive Secretary of the Lusophone Commonwealth, succeeding the Mozambican Murade Murargy and being succeeded by the Portuguese Francisco Ribeiro Telles in January 2019.

See also
Politics of São Tomé and Príncipe

References

|-

|-

|-

Executive Secretaries of the Community of Portuguese Language Countries
1960 births
Women rulers in Africa
Government ministers of São Tomé and Príncipe
Living people
Movement for the Liberation of São Tomé and Príncipe/Social Democratic Party politicians
Women government ministers of São Tomé and Príncipe
Women prime ministers
21st-century women politicians
Female finance ministers
Central bankers
21st-century São Tomé and Príncipe politicians